Squama (or squamous, squame) refers to a structure shaped like a decumbent scale of a fish. 

More specifically, it can refer to:
 Squama frontalis
 Squama occipitalis
 Squama temporalis, the squamous portion of the temporal bone
 Squamous cell

In Crustacea, it can refer to the scaphocerite, a scale-like, flattened exopod of the antenna.

In the Bivalvia, it refers to a thin, long, concentric imbrication.

Squamous epithelium refers to epithelium, e.g. the skin, composed of squamous cells.

See also:
 Desquamation